Petaladenium urceoliferum is a species of flowering plant in the family Fabaceae. It belongs to the subfamily Faboideae. It is the only member of the genus Petaladenium. It produces three chemical compounds in its leaves that are not found in other members of the Amburaneae: (2S,4S,5R)-5-hydroxy-4-methoxypipecolic acid, (2S,4R,5S)-5-hydroxy-4-methoxypipecolic acid, and (2S,4R,5R)-4-hydroxy-5-methoxypipecolic acid. Petaladenium urceoliferum is unique among legumes in having fimbriate–glandular wing petals.

References

Amburaneae
Monotypic Fabaceae genera
Taxa named by Adolpho Ducke